Melibe is a genus of sea slugs, nudibranchs, marine gastropod mollusks in the family Tethydidae.

Most nudibranchs are carnivores, but their prey is usually sessile or slow-moving animals such as sponges or bryozoans. In contrast, Melibe is an active predator which traps fast-moving free-swimming animals such as small crustaceans, using its extendable oral hood.

Species 
Species within the genus Melibe include 17 valid species:

Species inquirenda:
 Melibe capucina Bergh, 1875
 Melibe lonchocera (E. von Martens, 1879)
 Melibe ocellata Bergh, 1888

References

Further reading 
 Gosliner, T.M. 1987. Nudibranchs of Southern Africa

External links
 iNaturalist

Tethydidae
Gastropod genera